Events from the year 1995 in Romania.

Events 
 15-17 May – German president Roman Herzog visits Romania. He is the first German president to do so since 1980.
 16 June – McDonald's opens its first restaurant in Romania, inside the Unirea S.A. building in Bucharest.

Deaths
 21 February – Cristian Popescu, poet (born 1959).

See also

References

External links